Prasophyllum pallidum, commonly known as the pale leek orchid, is a species of orchid endemic to a south-eastern South Australia. It has a single tubular leaf and up to thirty green or yellowish-green flowers. It was previously thought to occur in Victoria but records from that state are now recognised as P. roseum.

Description
The flowers are green or yellowish-green and as with others in the genus, are inverted so that the labellum is above the column rather than below it. The ovary is swollen, realively large compared to the rest of the flower and stands out from the flowering stem. The lateral sepals are a similar length to the dorsal sepal but narrower and are free from each other. The edges of the labellum are crinkled and there is a pale green, fleshy callus along the centre of the labellum, extending almost to its tip. Flowering occurs from September to November and is stimulated by earlier fires.

Taxonomy and naming
Prasophyllum pallidum was first formally described in 1930 by William Henry Nicholls and the description was published in The Victorian Naturalist from a specimen collected near Pomonal. The specific epithet (pallidum) is a Latin word  meaning "ashen", "pale" or "wan". Specimens collected in Victoria as P. pallidum are now included in P. roseum.

Distribution and habitat
The pale leek orchid mostly grows in grassy forest from the Flinders Ranges to the Mount Lofty Ranges.

Conservation
Prasophyllum pallidum is listed "Vulnerable" under the Commonwealth Government Environment Protection and Biodiversity Conservation Act 1999 (EPBC) Act and under the South Australian National Parks and Wildlife Act 1972.

References

External links 
 

pallidum
Flora of South Australia
Endemic orchids of Australia
Plants described in 1930